Ross Darcy (born 21 March 1978 in Ireland) is an Irish retired footballer.

Career

As a youth player, Darcy chose to join English top flight side Tottenham Hotspur over the most successful club in England, Manchester United. After helping Tottenham Hotspur win the FA Youth Cup, Darcy joined the first team but injuries kept him from making an appearance and he left for Barnet in the English fourth division.

After returning to the Republic of Ireland with Dundalk, he retired due to injury.

References

External links
 Ross Darcy at Soccer Base

Republic of Ireland association footballers
Living people
1978 births
Association football defenders
Barnet F.C. players
Dover Athletic F.C. players